Claire Trentain is an Australian pop singer and songwriter from Queensland, Australia. Her debut album, Loving the Blue and Green, was produced by Murlyn Music Group and had two charting singles, "Warmth" and "What Would You Say?"

Discography

Albums
 Loving the Blue & Green (2007)

Singles

References

External links
Claire Trentain website

Australian women singers
Living people
Year of birth missing (living people)